Green Party leadership elections took place in the following countries during 2018:

2018 Green Party of Alberta leadership election
2018 Green Party of Aotearoa New Zealand female co-leadership election
2018 Green Party (Czech Republic) leadership election
2018 Green Party of England and Wales leadership election